The Ffestiniog Flags is a geologic formation in Wales. It preserves fossils dating back to the Cambrian period.

See also

 List of fossiliferous stratigraphic units in Wales

References
 

Cambrian System of Europe
Cambrian Wales